Astroblepus caquetae is a species of catfish of the family Astroblepidae. It can be found in upper Amazon River drainage in Colombia.

References

Bibliography
Eschmeyer, William N., ed. 1998. Catalog of Fishes. Special Publication of the Center for Biodiversity Research and Information, num. 1, vol. 1–3. California Academy of Sciences. San Francisco, California, United States. 2905. .

Astroblepus
Catfish of South America
Freshwater fish of Colombia
Endemic fauna of Colombia
Fish described in 1943
Taxa named by Henry Weed Fowler